Judith Ann McGrath (born July 2, 1952) is an American television executive.

Early life and education
She is a graduate of Scranton High School in Scranton, Pennsylvania and Cedar Crest College in Allentown, Pennsylvania.

Career
In 2004, McGrath was named chairman and chief executive officer of MTV Networks, where she was responsible for management of the networks' channels, including MTV, MTV2, VH1, Comedy Central, Nickelodeon, TV Land, and Logo. 

In 2009, she was named the 62nd most powerful woman in the world by Forbes. She stepped down from her position on May 5, 2011.

In 2013, in partnership with Sony Music, McGrath launched a mobile video startup, Astronauts Wanted: 'No Experience Necessary'.

In 2014, McGrath joined the board of directors of Amazon.

References

External links
 "2004 Global Business Influentials" at CNN.com
 Broadcasting & Cable Profile
 BusinessWeek Profile
 

1952 births
Living people
American television executives
Women television executives
Cedar Crest College alumni
Businesspeople from Scranton, Pennsylvania
MTV executives
Nickelodeon executives
Comedy Central executives